Rebun may refer to:
Rebun Island, an island in Japan
Rebun, Hokkaidō, a town on the island
Rebun District, Hokkaidō, a district which the town belongs to
Mount Rebun, a mountain on the island